Ramon Filippini (17 November 1928 – 22 June 2008) was a Swedish footballer of Italian descent who played as a forward.

He played 12 games and scored 3 goals for Malmö FF when they won 1950–51 Allsvenskan.

References

Association football forwards
Swedish footballers
Allsvenskan players
Malmö FF players
1928 births
2008 deaths